Ortega, California may refer to:
Ortega, San Joaquin County, California, San Joaquin County, California
Ortega, Santa Barbara County, California, Santa Barbara County, California